Scopula optivata is a species of moth of the  family Geometridae. It is found in Australia, including Tasmania.

Subspecies
Scopula optivata optivata
Scopula optivata youngi Holloway, 1977 (Norfolk Island)

References

Moths described in 1861
Moths of Australia
optivata
Taxa named by Francis Walker (entomologist)